An expedition by Kab ibn Umair al-Ghifari (كعب بن عمير الغفاري) to Dhat Atlah, took place in July 629 AD, 8AH, 3rd month, of the Islamic Calendar.

Expedition
According to the Muslim Scholar Safiur Rahman Mubarakpuri, Muhammad received some information that the Banu Quda‘a (Tribe of Quda'a) had gathered a large number of men to attack the Muslim positions. So Muhammad despatched Ka’b ibn 'Umair al-Ghifari al-Ansari at the head of 15 men to deal with this situation to a location beyond Wadi al-Qura (part of Syria).

They encountered the warriors, and called them to accept Islam, but the polytheists refused and showered the Muslims with arrows killing all of them except one (who pretended to be dead) who was carried back home later seriously wounded to tell Mohammed what had happened.

Muhammad was upset by this and planned an expedition to avenge his followers. The plan was cancelled when Muhammad learnt that the enemy had deserted the place.

See also
Military career of Muhammad
List of expeditions of Muhammad

Notes

629
Campaigns ordered by Muhammad